Sébastien Maté, born September 19, 1972 in Mont-de-Marsan, France is a retired professional footballer.

External links

1972 births
Living people
People from Mont-de-Marsan
French footballers
AS Cherbourg Football players
Limoges FC players
Stade Lavallois players
Amiens SC players
Olympique de Marseille players
Ligue 2 players
Association football goalkeepers
Entente SSG players
Stade Briochin players
French beach soccer players
Pays d'Aix FC players
Sportspeople from Landes (department)
Footballers from Nouvelle-Aquitaine